Jesse Thomas (born 28 February 1980 in Bend, Oregon) is an American professional triathlete, who has won several Ironman and Ironman 70.3 competitions.

He is married to former professional runner Lauren Fleshman.

Major results

References

1980 births
Living people
American male triathletes
Sportspeople from Bend, Oregon